As Sweet as Sin is the debut album by New Zealand band, the Bleeders released in 2006. It was recorded in 2005 in New Jersey.

The track "Wild at Heart" is featured in a scene in the New Zealand film, Sione's Wedding, but is not featured on the film's soundtrack.

Track listing
"The Kill"
"Secrets"
"Holding On"
"Out of Time"
"Wild at Heart"
"Nightmares"
"Night Sky"
"S.O.S." featuring Danny Diablo
"Silhouettes"
"It's Black II"
"Bridges Burning"
"Femme Fatale" featuring Roxy
"Eating Up Your Mind"
"A Bleeding Heart"
"The Big Mind"

Personnel
Angelo Munro - vocals
Hadleigh Donald - guitars, backing vocals
Ian King - guitars, backing vocals
Gareth Stack - bass, backing vocals
Matt Clark - drumming, vocals
Danny Diablo - additional vocals on "S.O.S."

Bleeders albums
2006 debut albums
Albums produced by Sal Villanueva